The 2021 Women's Challenge Cup (sponsored as the 2022 Betfred Women's Challenge Cup) is the 9th edition of the of the rugby league knockout tournament, and the first since the COVID-19 pandemic, with the last edition being played in 2019 as the 2020 edition was cancelled.

The Cup was won by St Helens who beat York City Knights 36–4 in the final at Leigh Sports Village on 5 June 2021.
Due to ongoing COVID-19 restrictions in the United Kingdom, the Rugby Football League limited entry to the 2021 competition to the 10 clubs playing in the 2021 Women's Super League.  A preliminary round will see the two new teams to the Super League, Warrington Wolves and Huddersfield Giants, play each other. York City Knights and Wakefield Trinity who finished 7th and 8th in the 2019 Women's Super League will contest the other preliminary round tie. The two winning teams will advance to the quarter-finals where the other six teams will join the competition.  The preliminary round and the quarter-finals will be played at neutral grounds and behind closed doors due to COVID-19 restrictions.

The final was played on 5 June as part of a triple-header with the semi-finals of the men's tournament.  For the first time the final was shown live on TV as it was shown on BBC Two.

Preliminary round

Quarter-finals
The draw for the quarter-finals was made on 28 April. All four ties were played on Sunday 9 May.

Semi-finals
The draw for the semi-finals will be made on 9 May. The ties were played on 22 May as a double header at York City Knights' LNER Community Stadium.

Final
The final of the women's challenge cup, was played at Leigh Sports Village, on 5 June 2021 as part of a triple header with the semi-finals of the men's tournament.

See also
 2021 Men's Challenge Cup

Notes

References

2021
2021 in English rugby league
rugby league
2021 in women's rugby league